"Moon" is a song by American rapper Kanye West from his tenth studio album, Donda (2021). The song features fellow  American rappers Don Toliver and Kid Cudi. It initially only had an appearance from Toliver, however Kid Cudi was added after the album's first listening event. The song peaked at number 17 on the US Billboard Hot 100, also reaching number 7 on the US Hot R&B/Hip Hop Songs chart.

Background
"Moon" was debuted during the album's first listening event July 23, 2021, at Mercedes-Benz Stadium in Atlanta, though only Don Toliver guested on the version played. By the time the second listening party for Donda was held at the stadium on August 5, 2021, the song had been updated to include an appearance from Kid Cudi alongside Toliver. The rapper tweeted that the final version was new to him since he had not heard it before the event, clarifying that he knew of his presence on the album and only did not "hear final mixes". Kid Cudi also recalled he was not on the album when he tweeted he was not, admitting West contacted him the next week and they "made it work". The rapper also recorded for fellow album track "Remote Control", though his contributions were removed from the final version. A new version of "Moon" was played for Dondas third listening event at Soldier Field in Chicago on August 26, 2021, which replaced Kid Cudi with the Sunday Service Choir. The version of the track that was included on the album three days later restored his appearance.

During a Twitch livestream on September 7, 2021, fellow rapper Lil Yachty, who appears on Donda track "Ok Ok", revealed that he was behind Kid Cudi being included on "Moon". The rapper recalled an excerpt from the song being played on TikTok after the album's first listening party, to which him and "everyone in the comments" responded by expressing that Kid Cudi "would sound great" on it. Lil Yachty said he contacted fellow rapper and Donda contributor Vory after the excerpt gained popularity on TikTok, declaring that Kid Cudi "gotta get on 'Moon'". The rapper explained that Vory reached out to West, who then contacted Kid Cudi for the song; he concluded by joking, "Y'all can thank me."

In an interview with Ebro on In The Morning on Hot 97, Don Toliver noted that the final version of "Moon" was completely different from what he initially recorded on.

Commercial performance
Upon the release of Donda, "Moon" debuted at number 17 on the US Billboard Hot 100. The song simultaneously entered at number six on both the US Christian Songs and Gospel Songs charts. It further reached number seven on the US Hot R&B/Hip-Hop Songs chart, placing among West's seven simultaneous top-10 hits that led to him tying Drake's record on the chart. In Canada, the song charted at number 21 on the Canadian Hot 100.

The song was most successful in New Zealand, reaching number nine on the NZ Singles Chart. In Australia, it entered the ARIA Singles Chart at number 15. The song performed similarly in Iceland, debuting at number 12 on the Icelandic Singles Chart. It reached numbers 22 and 23 on the Danish Track Top-40 and Norwegian Topp 20 Singles charts, respectively. Top-40 positions were also attained by the song in Lithuania, Ireland, and Portugal, while it charted at number 20 on the Billboard Global 200.

Credits and personnel
Credits adapted from Tidal.

 Kanye West producer, songwriter
 E. Vax producer, songwriter
 BoogzDaBeast co-producer, songwriter
 DJ Khalil co-producer, songwriter
 Caleb Zackery Toliver songwriter
 Scott Mescudi songwriter
 Irko mastering engineer, mix engineer
 Alejandro Rodriguez-Dawsøn recording engineer
 Drrique Rendeer recording engineer
 James Kelso recording engineer
 Josh Berg recording engineer
 Mikalai Skrobat recording engineer
 Roark Bailey recording engineer
 Will Chason assistant recording engineer
 Louis Bell vocal editing
 Patrick Hundley vocal editing

Charts

Weekly charts

Year-end charts

Certifications

References

2021 songs
Kanye West songs
Song recordings produced by DJ Khalil
Song recordings produced by Kanye West
Songs written by DJ Khalil
Songs written by Don Toliver
Songs written by Kanye West
Songs written by Kid Cudi
Don Toliver songs
Kid Cudi songs